The Battle of the Vikhra River took place on 29 April 1386 on the Vikhra River, tributary of the Sozh River, near Mstislavl between the Grand Duchy of Lithuania and the Principality of Smolensk. The Lithuanians achieved a decisive victory and Smolensk was forced to accept being a vassal of Lithuania.

Andrei of Polotsk fought with his younger half-brother Jogaila for the throne of the Grand Duchy of Lithuania. Andrei allied with the Livonian Order and Prince Svyatoslav II of Smolensk, who wanted to reconquer the Principality of Mstislavl. In February 1386, when Jogaila and his allies celebrated his wedding to Jadwiga of Poland and coronation as Polish king in Kraków, the Order invaded Lithuania, almost reaching Vilnius. In March, the army of Smolensk besieged Vitebsk and Orsha, but could not take them. Svyatoslav devastated many lands on the Lithuanian border and besieged Mstislavl, which was defended by Karigaila, son of Algirdas.

Upon hearing the news of the invasion, Jogaila sent a great army under the command of his brother Skirgaila. The army also included Kaributas, Lengvenis, and Vytautas. Mstislavl withstood ten days of siege before the Lithuanian army reached it and engaged the Smolensk army. The result of the battle was a complete defeat of the Smolensk troops and the deaths of Svyatoslav and his nephew Ivan. Two of Svyatoslav's sons, Gleb Svyatoslavich and Yury of Smolensk, were seriously wounded and taken prisoners. Skirgaila's army approached Smolensk, but did not lay siege. Yuri, who according to the Bychowiec Chronicle was married to a niece of Skirgaila and Jogaila, was installed as the Prince of Smolensk and as a vassal to Lithuania. Gleb Svyatoslavich was taken as a hostage to Lithuania.

Eventually, Gleb returned to Smolensk and challenged Yuri for the throne. That provided Grand Duke Vytautas with an opportunity to seize Smolensk in 1395.

References

the Vikhra River
1386 in Europe
14th century in Lithuania
Vikhra
Vikhra
Military history of Belarus